Asia, comprising different language families and some unrelated isolates. The major language families include Austroasiatic, Austronesian, Caucasian, Dravidian, Indo-European, Afroasiatic, Turkic, Sino-Tibetan and Kra–Dai. Most, but not all, have a long history as a written language.

Language groups

The major families in terms of numbers are Indo-European and Indo-Aryan languages and Dravidian languages in South Asia and Sino-Tibetan in East Asia. Several other families are regionally dominant.

Sino-Tibetan

Sino-Tibetan includes Chinese, Tibetan, Burmese, Karen, Boro and numerous languages of the Tibetan Plateau, southern China, Burma, and North east India.

Indo-European
The Indo-European languages are primarily represented by the Indo-Iranian branch, with its two main subgroups: Indo-Aryan (represented by a large number of languages of South Asia such as Hindi/Urdu, Bengali, Punjabi, Marathi or Gujarati) and Iranian (including languages like Persian, Kurdish and Pashto, which are spoken in Iran and neighbouring regions).

In addition, other branches of Indo-European spoken in Asia include the Slavic branch, which includes Russian in Siberia; Greek around the Black Sea; and Armenian; as well as extinct languages such as Hittite of Anatolia and Tocharian of (Chinese) Turkestan.

Altaic families

A number of smaller, but important and separately distinguished language families spread across central and northern Asia have long been linked in a hypothetical,  controversial and unproven Altaic family. These are the Turkic, Mongolic, Tungusic (including Manchu), Koreanic, and Japonic languages. But recently, it is often considered as Sprachbund by the majority.

Mon–Khmer

The Mon–Khmer languages (also known as Austroasiatic) are the language family in South and Southeast Asia. Languages given official status are Vietnamese and Khmer (Cambodian).

Kra–Dai

The Kra–Dai languages (also known as Tai-Kadai) are found in southern China, Northeast India and Southeast Asia. Languages given official status are Thai (Siamese) and Lao.

Austronesian

The Austronesian languages are widespread throughout Maritime Southeast Asia, including major languages such as Fijian (Fiji), 
Hiligaynon
Bikol, Cebuano, Tagalog (Philippines), and Malay (Malaysia, Singapore, and Brunei). Javanese, Sundanese, and Madurese of Indonesia, as well as Indonesian which is the largest language in this family.

Dravidian

The Dravidian languages of southern Asia  (India) and parts of Sri Lanka include Tamil, Kannada, Telugu, and Malayalam, while smaller languages such as Gondi and Brahui are spoken in central India and Pakistan respectively.

Afro-Asiatic

The Afroasiatic languages (in older sources Hamito-Semitic) are represented in Asia by the Semitic branch. Semitic languages are spoken in Western Asia, and include Arabic, Hebrew and Aramaic, in addition to extinct languages such as Akkadian.

Siberian families

Besides the Altaic families already mentioned (of which Tungusic is today a minor family of Siberia), there are a number of small language families and isolates spoken across northern Asia. These include the Uralic languages of western Siberia (better known for Hungarian and Finnish in Europe), the Yeniseian languages (linked to Turkic and to the Athabaskan languages of North America), Yukaghir, Nivkh of Sakhalin, Ainu of northern Japan, Chukotko-Kamchatkan in easternmost Siberia, and—just barely—Eskimo–Aleut. Some linguists have noted that the Koreanic languages share more similarities with the Paleosiberian languages than with the Altaic languages. The extinct Ruan-ruan language of Mongolia is unclassified, and does not show genetic relationships with any other known language family.

Caucasian families

Three small families are spoken in the Caucasus: Kartvelian languages, such as Georgian; Northeast Caucasian (Dagestanian languages), such as Chechen; and Northwest Caucasian, such as Circassian. The latter two may be related to each other. The extinct Hurro-Urartian languages may be related as well.

Small families of Southern Asia
Although dominated by major languages and families, there are number of minor families and isolates in South Asia & Southeast Asia. From west to east, these include:
extinct languages of the Fertile Crescent such as Sumerian and Elamite.
extinct languages of South Asia: the unclassified Harappan language
small language families and isolates of the Indian subcontinent: Burushaski, Kusunda, and Nihali. The Vedda language of Sri Lanka is likely an isolate that has mixed with Sinhala.
the two Andamanese language families: Great Andamanese and Ongan; Sentinelese remains undocumented to date, and hence unclassified.
unclassified languages in Southeast Asia: Kenaboi.
Language isolates and independent language families in Arunachal: Digaro, Hrusish (including the Miji languages), Midzu, Puroik, Siangic, and Kho-Bwa
Hmong–Mien (Miao–Yao) scattered across southern China and Southeast Asia
several "Papuan" families of the central and eastern Malay Archipelago: languages of Halmahera, East Timor, and the extinct Tambora of Sumbawa. Numerous additional families are spoken in Indonesian New Guinea, but this lies outside the scope of an article on Asian languages.
Hattic was an unclassificed language in Anatolia.

Creoles and pidgins

The eponymous pidgin ("business") language developed with European trade in China. Of the many creoles to have developed, the most spoken today are Chavacano, a Spanish-based creole of the Philippines, and various Malay-based creoles such as Manado Malay influenced by Portuguese. A very well-known Portuguese-based creole is the Kristang, which is spoken in Malacca, a city-state in Malaysia.

Sign languages

A number of sign languages are spoken throughout Asia. These include the Japanese Sign Language family, Chinese Sign Language, Indo-Pakistani Sign Language, as well as a number of small indigenous sign languages of countries such as Nepal, Thailand, and Vietnam. Many official sign languages are part of the French Sign Language family.

Official languages

Asia and Europe are the only two continents where most countries use native languages as their official languages, though English is also widespread as an international language.

See also
Asian studies
Asianic languages
East Asian languages
Languages of South Asia
List of extinct languages of Asia
Classification schemes for Southeast Asian languages

References